Joe Medew-Ewen is an Australian cricketer. He made his first-class debut on 6 March 2021, for South Australia in the 2020–21 Sheffield Shield season.

References

External links
 

Year of birth missing (living people)
Living people
Australian cricketers
South Australia cricketers
Place of birth missing (living people)